The 2007 Tunbridge Wells Borough Council election took place on 3 May 2007 to elect members of Tunbridge Wells Borough Council in Kent, England. One third of the council was up for election and the Conservative Party stayed in overall control of the council.

After the election, the composition of the council was:
Conservative 41
Liberal Democrat 7

Election result
The results saw the Labour Party lose its last councillor, Ronnie Ooi, on the council. Ooi lost his seat in Southborough and High Brooms ward after campaigning by distancing himself from the national Labour government and calling on voters to preserve an opposition to the Conservatives on the council.

Ward results

References

2007 English local elections
2007
2000s in Kent